The Sakumtha River is a  river in British Columbia, Canada, flowing south out of the Kitimat Ranges from an origin west of the Tsaydaychuz Peak massif into the Dean River north of Bella Coola.

Name origin
"Sakumtha" is from the Kimsquit dialect of the Nuxalk language and means "to wade across".

See also
List of British Columbia rivers

References

Rivers of the Kitimat Ranges
Range 3 Coast Land District